Jacques Eliacin François Marie Paganel is one of the main characters in Jules Verne's 1867-68 novel In Search of the Castaways (original title Les Enfants du capitaine Grant). Paganel represents the absent-minded professor stock character.

Verne gives a memorable characterisation of his hero:

In the novel, Paganel is the "Secretary of the Geographical Society of Paris, Corresponding Member of the Societies of Berlin, Bombay, Darmstadt, Leipsic, London, St. Petersburg, Vienna, and New York; Honorary Member of the Royal Geographical and Ethnographical Institute of the East Indies". After many years of being a cabinet professor, he decides to take a voyage to India, but by mistake boards the protagonists' yacht Duncan (which is going to Patagonia), the first of Paganel's absent-minded actions.

A further mistake was to learn the Portuguese language accidentally, rather than Spanish. Paganel studied The Lusiads of Camoens over six weeks, believing the poem to be written in Spanish.

Nevertheless, Paganel proves to be an important member of the search party. His interpretation of the documents is vital in the advancement of the novel; he also provides numerous geographical references and is a constant source of humor.

In film and television
Actors who have played Paganel on the screen include:
Nikolai Cherkasov, in The Children of Captain Grant (1936)
Maurice Chevalier, in In Search of the Castaways (1962)
Lembit Ulfsak, in In Search of Captain Grant (1985)

References

Jules Verne characters
Fictional French people in literature
Fictional scientists
Literary characters introduced in 1868